The 2012–13 Santa Clara Broncos men's basketball team represented the University of Santa Clara during the 2012–13 NCAA Division I men's basketball season. This was head coach Kerry Keating's sixth season at Santa Clara. The Broncos played their home games at the Leavey Center and were members of the West Coast Conference. They finished the season 26–12, 9–7 in WCC play to finish in fourth place. They lost in the quarterfinals of the WCC tournament to Loyola Marymount. They were invited to the 2013 College Basketball Invitational where they defeated Vermont, Purdue and Wright State to advance to the best-of-three games finals against George Mason. They won the series 2 games to 1 to become the 2013 CBI Champions. Santa Clara is the first school to win a CBI championship and a CIT championship (CIT won by the 2010–11 team).

Before the Season

Departures

Recruiting

Roster

Schedule and results

|-
!colspan=9 style="background:#F0E8C4; color:#AA003D;"| Exhibition

|-
!colspan=9 style="background:#AA003D; color:#F0E8C4;"| Regular season

|-
!colspan=9 style="background:#F0E8C4; color:#AA003D;"| 2013 West Coast Conference tournament
 
|-
!colspan=9 style="background:#F0E8C4; color:#AA003D;"| 2013 College Basketball Invitational

References

Santa Clara Broncos men's basketball seasons
Santa Clara
Santa Clara
College Basketball Invitational championship seasons
Santa Clara Broncos Men's Basketball
Santa Clara Broncos Men's Basketball